The NWA Shockwave Internet Championship was a professional wrestling Internet/television championship in NWA Shockwave (NWA-SW) and the National Wrestling Alliance (NWA). It was the original title of the CyberSpace Wrestling Federation promotion and was later recognized by the NWA as a regional title. It was introduced as the CSWF Internet Championship on October 19, 2002. It was established as an NWA heavyweight championship in 2005 following the promotion's admission into the NWA. The promotion became NWA: Cyberspace, and later NWA Shockwave, with the title remaining active until the promotion's close in 2007.

The inaugural champion was Billy Firehawk, who won a 15-man Rumble Royale on October 19, 2002 to become the first CSWF Heavyweight Champion. There were 8 officially recognized champions, however only two men, Josh Daniels and Papadon, held the belt more than once. Daniels also held the record as the longest reigning champion at 357 days. Many then current wrestlers from Total Non-Stop Action challenged for the title while competing in the promotion; Bobby Roode held the championship in for several months in 2006. Its last champion, Papadon, held both the Internet and Heavyweight titles during the final months of its existence.

Title history

Names

Reigns

List of combined reigns

Footnotes

See also
List of National Wrestling Alliance championships

References

External links
NWA Shockwave on Myspace
NWA Cyberspace on Myspace
CSWF.com
CSWOL.com

NWA Shockwave championships
Television wrestling championships
National Wrestling Alliance championships